An African American is a citizen or resident of the United States who has origins in any of the black populations of Africa.  African American-related topics include:

1
1st Rhode Island Regiment
10th Cavalry Regiment (United States)
12 Years a Slave (film)
1968 Miami riot

2
2nd Cavalry Division (United States)
27th Cavalry Regiment (United States)
28th Cavalry Regiment (United States)
24th Infantry Regiment (United States)
25th Infantry Regiment (United States)

3
3 Strikes (film)
30 Years to Life
35 and Ticking
333rd Field Artillery Battalion (United States)
366th Infantry Regiment (United States)
369th Infantry Regiment (United States)
371st Infantry Regiment (United States)
372nd Infantry Regiment (United States)

4
4 Little Girls
4CHOSEN: The Documentary
40 acres and a mule
41st Infantry Regiment (United States)

5
5th Tank Group (United States)
5th United States Colored Cavalry
5th United States Colored Infantry Regiment
500 Years Later
551st Parachute Infantry Battalion (United States)
555th Parachute Infantry Battalion (United States)

7
758th Tank Battalion (United States)
761st Tank Battalion (United States)

8
805th Pioneer Infantry

9
9th Cavalry Regiment (United States)
92nd Infantry Division (United States)
93rd Infantry Division (United States)

A

AALBC.com
Abolitionism in the United States
Above the Rim
ACAE
Acid jazz
Acting white
Address to the Negroes of the State of New York
The Advocate (Portland, Oregon)
Affirmative action
African American
(List of) African-American abolitionists
(List of) African-American astronauts
African-American book publishers in the United States, 1960–80
African-American church
African American cinema
African-American culture
African-American culture and sexual orientation
African-American dance
(List of) African-American documentary films
African-American English
African-American family structure
African-American Film Critics Association
(List of) African-American firsts
African-American hair
African-American Heritage Sites (U.S. National Park Service)
African-American history
African-American Institute (Northeastern University)
African-American inventors and scientists
(List of) African-American jurists
African-American literature
(List of) African-American mathematicians
(List of) African-American Medal of Honor recipients
African-American middle class
African American Military History Museum
African American Museum in Philadelphia
African American Museum of Iowa
African American Museum of the Arts
African-American music
African-American musical theater
African-American names
African American National Biography Project
African-American neighborhood
African-American newspapers
(List of) African-American officeholders during the Reconstruction
African-American organized crime
African American Policy Forum
African-American Research Library and Cultural Center
African American Review
African-American studies
(List of) African-American United States senators
African-American Vernacular English
African-American Woman Suffrage Movement
African-American women in politics
African-American Women for Reproductive Freedom
(List of) African-American visual artists
(Lists of) African Americans
African Americans and the G.I. Bill
African American Civil War Memorial
African Americans at the Siege of Petersburg
African Americans in Alabama
African Americans in Atlanta
African Americans in Baltimore
African Americans in California
African Americans in Chicago
African Americans in Davenport, Iowa
African Americans in France
African Americans in Florida
African Americans in France
African Americans in Georgia (U.S. state)
African Americans in Ghana
African Americans in Kansas
African Americans in Louisiana
African Americans in Maryland
African Americans in Mississippi
African Americans in New York City
African Americans in North Carolina
African Americans in Omaha, Nebraska
African Americans in San Francisco
African Americans in South Carolina
African Americans in Texas
African Americans in Tennessee
African Americans in Utah
African Americans in the United States Congress
African American National Biography Project
(List of) African-American Republicans
African Blood Brotherhood
African Burial Ground National Monument
African Cemetery at Higgs Beach
African Christian Union
African diaspora
African Hebrew Israelites of Jerusalem
African Methodist Episcopal Church
Africana Cultures and Policy Studies Institute
Africana philosophy
Africana womanism
Africans in Hawaii
Africatown
AfriCOBRA
Afro
Afro-American Cultural Center at Yale
Afro-Academic, Cultural, Technological and Scientific Olympics
Afro-American Historical and Genealogical Society
Afro-American Museum of Pompano Beach
Afro-American settlement in Africa
Afrocentrism
Afro-Cuban jazz
Afrodite Superstar
Afrofuturism
Afro Psalms
Afro-punk
Afro-Punk (film)
Agana race riot
Ain't I a Woman? (book)
Ain't Supposed to Die a Natural Death
Akeelah and the Bee
Alabama A&M University
Alabama Christian Movement for Human Rights
Alabama Democratic Conference
Alabama State University
Albany State University
Alcorn State University
Alexander v. Holmes County Board of Education
Alexandria Black History Museum
All About You (film)
All God's Children (film)
All Power to the People
All the Young Men
Allen University
Alliance of Black Jews
Alpha Kappa Alpha sorority
Alpha Phi Alpha fraternity
American Black Film Festival
American Black Upper Class
American Civil War
American Descendants of Slavery
American Gangster (film)
American Negro Academy
American Negro Ballet Company
American Negro Labor Congress
American Negro Theater
American Slavery As It Is
American Society of African Culture
American Society of Muslims
American Tennis Association
La Amistad
Amos 'n' Andy
An Act for the Gradual Abolition of Slavery
And you are lynching Negroes
Angola, Florida
Ann Arbor Decision
Another Country (novel)
Anti-miscegenation laws in the United States
Anti-Tom literature
Antwone Fisher (film)
A. Philip Randolph Institute
Apollo Theater
April Fools (2007 film)
Are We Done Yet?
Are We There Yet? (film)
Apostolic Faith Mission Church of God
University of Arkansas at Pine Bluff
Arkansas Baptist College
The Art Movements
Artworks commemorating African-Americans in Washington, D.C.
Aruba (film)
Ashton Villa
Jabari Asim
Association of Black Photographers
Association of Black Psychologists
Association of Black Women Historians
Association for the Study of African American Life and History
At the Beach LA
ATL (film)
Atlanta Compromise
Atlanta Conference of Negro Problems
Atlanta Exposition Speech
The Atlanta Way (film)
A.U.M.P. Church
Aunt Phillis's Cabin
Ausar Auset Society
Ax Handle Saturday

B

BAADASSSSS!
Baby Boy (film)
Baby mama
Backstreet Cultural Museum
Back-to-Africa movement
Bad Boys
Bait (2000 film)
Ball culture
Bamboozled
Band of Angels
Banished (film)
Banjee
Banjo
Barber-Scotia College
Barbershop (film)
Barbershop 2: Back in Business
Baseball color line
Baton Rouge bus boycott
Battle of Ambos Nogales
Battle of Baxter Springs
Battle of Bear Valley
Battle of Beecher Island
Battle of Black Jack
Battle of Olustee
Battle of Fort Pillow
Battle of Poison Spring
Battle of Saltville I
Battle of Saltville II
Battle of Fort Tularosa
Battle of Fort Walker
Battle of Negro Fort
Battle of Osawatomie
Battle of the Saline River
Bayview-Hunters Point, San Francisco
Beah: A Black Woman Speaks
Beale Street Mama
Bean pie
Beatboxing
A Beautiful Soul (film)
Bébé's Kids
Bebop
Beecher's Bible
Bell v. Maryland
Belly (film)
Beloved (1998 film)
Benedict College
Bennett College
The Best Man (1999 film)
BET Awards
 BET Her
Bethel Literary and Historical Society
Bethune-Cookman University
The Betrayal (1948 film)
Beyond the Down Low
Big Ain't Bad
Big band
Big River (musical)
Big Momma's House
Biker Boyz
Biloxi wade-ins
The Bingo Long Traveling All-Stars & Motor Kings
Bird (1988 film)
Bishop State Community College
Bishop College (historical)
Black Americana
Black American Princess
Black American Racers Association
Black American Sign Language
List of black animated characters
Black-appeal stations
Black Arts Movement
Black August (film)
Black Autonomy Network Community Organization
Black Betty
Black billionaires
Blackbirds of 1928
Black and Blue (musical)
Black Bottom
Black Boy
The Black Candle
Black capitalism
Black Catholicism
Black church
Black Coaches & Administrators
(List of) Black college football classics
Black Consciousness Movement
Black conservatism
Black conservatism in the United States
Black Cultural Association
Black Data Processing Associates
Black Dispatches
Black doll
Black elite
Black Enterprise
Black Enterprise Business Report
Black Entertainment and Sports Lawyers Association
Black Entertainment Television
Black existentialism
Blackface
Black Family Channel
Black feminism
Black Filmmakers Hall of Fame
Black flight
Black gay pride
Black Hebrew Israelites
Black Hispanic and Latino Americans
Black History Month
Black Inches
Black Indians in the United States
Black Intelligence Test of Cultural Homogeneity
Black is Beautiful
Black is... Black Ain't
Black leftism
Black Liberators
Black Like Me
Black Like Me (film)
The Black List (film series)
Black Lives Matter
Black Loyalist
Black Mafia
Black Mafia Family
The Black Man: His Antecedents, His Genius and His Achievements
Black matriarchy
Black mecca
Black middle class
Black Movie Awards
Black Music Month
Black nationalism
Black orientalism
Black Panther Party
Black participation in college basketball
BlackPast.org
Black Patriot (American Revolution)
Black Patti Records
Black people
Black people in Ireland
Black Pioneers
BlackPlanet
Black players in American professional football
Black populism
Black Power
Black Power and the American Myth
Black Power movement
Black pride
Black psychology
Black Radical Congress
Black Reconstruction in America
Black Reel Awards
Black refugee (War of 1812)
Black Rock Coalition
The Black Scholar
Black school
Black science fiction
Black Seminoles
Black Seminole Scouts
Black separatism
Black sermonic tradition
Black Sexual Politics: African Americans, Gender, and the New Racism
Black sitcom
Black Star Line
Black supremacy
Black Swan Records
Black Theater of Ardmore
Black theology
Black Women Organized for Political Action
The Black World Today
Blacks and Jews (film)
Blankman
Blaxploitation
Bleeding Kansas
Bling-bling
BLK (magazine)
Blockbusting
Block party
The Blood of Jesus
Bleeding Kansas
Bloods
Bluefield State College
Blue Front Cafe
Blue Hill Avenue (film)
Blue note
Blues
Blues in the Night (musical)
The Bluest Eye
Board of Education of Oklahoma City v. Dowell
Body and Soul (1925 film)
Bones (2001 film)
Bolling v. Sharpe
Boogie-woogie
Booker T. Washington Junior College
Booker T. Washington National Monument
Book of Love (2002 film)
Book of Negroes
Boomerang (1992 film)
The Boondocks (comic strip)
Booty Call
Bop (disambiguation)
Bossip
Bouie v. City of Columbia
Bounce TV
Bowie State University
Boynton v. Virginia
Boy! What a Girl!
Boyz n the Hood
Brass Ankles
Tawana Brawley rape allegations
Bread and Roses (disambiguation)
Break (music)
Breakin' All the Rules
B-boying or breakdancing
Br'er Rabbit
Br'er Rabbit Earns a Dollar a Minute
Briggs v. Elliott
Bright Road
Bring in 'da Noise, Bring in 'da Funk
The Brute (1920 film)
Bronner Bros.
Brother John (film)
Brother Martin: Servant of Jesus
The Brothers (2001 film)
Brotherhood of Sleeping Car Porters
Browder v. Gayle
Brown v. Board of Education
Brownsville affair
Bubbling Brown Sugar
Buchanan v. Warley
Buck and the Preacher
Bud Billiken Club
Bud Billiken Parade and Picnic
The Buffalo Saga
Buffalo Soldier
Bureau of Colored Troops
Burlesque in Harlem
Bush Mama
Bushwhacker
Bustin' Loose (film)
Butler Medal

C

Cabin in the Sky (film)
Cadillac Records
Café Society
Cakewalk
California African American Museum
Call and response
Callaloo (journal)
Cambridge, Maryland
Camp Ashby
Camp Lejeune Incident
Camp Lockett
Camp Nelson National Cemetery
Canterbury Female Boarding School
Carmel Indians
Carmen: A Hip Hopera
Carmen Jones
Carmen Jones (film)
Caught Up (film)
Cave Canem Foundation
CB4
4th Cavalry Regiment (United States)
Central Brooklyn Jazz Consortium
Central State University
Char Room (film)
Cheyney University of Pennsylvania
Chesapeake pipes
Chestnut Ridge people
Chicago stepping
Chief Buffalo Child Long Lance
Children, Go Where I Send Thee
Children of the plantation
Chitlin circuit
Chowanoke
Christian Methodist Episcopal Church
The Church of Saint Coltrane
Civil Brand
City Mission Society
Civil Rights Act of 1866
Civil Rights Act of 1875
Civil Rights Act of 1957
Civil Rights Act of 1960
Civil Rights Act of 1964
Civil Rights Cases
Civil rights movement
Civil rights movement (1865–1896)
Civil rights movement (1896–1954)
Civil rights movement in Omaha, Nebraska
The Civil War (musical)
Claflin University
Clark Atlanta University
Class Act
Classical Theatre of Harlem
Claudine (film)
Clef Club
Clinton Junior College
Clockers (film)
Clotel
Clothing in the Ragtime Era
Coach Carter
Coahoma Community College
Coalition of Black Trade Unionists
Coeur d'Alene, Idaho labor confrontation of 1899
Coffy
Coleman Manufacturing Company
Colfax massacre
The Collegiate 100
Colonial period of South Carolina
Colonization Societies
Color Adjustment
Color blindness (race)
The Color of Friendship (2000 film)
Color line (civil rights issue)
Colored
Colored Episcopal Mission
Colored Music Settlement School
Colored National Labor Union
Colored Soldiers Monument in Frankfort
Colorism
The Color Purple
The Color Purple (musical)
Colors Straight Up
Columbia Air Center
Combahee River Collective
Come Back, Charleston Blue
Coming to America
Commitments (film)
Common Burying Ground and Island Cemetery
The Communist Party and African-Americans
Community Reinvestment Act
 Composers of African descent
Compromise of 1850
Concordia College, Selma
Congdon Street Baptist Church
Congo Square
Congressional Black Caucus
Congress of Racial Equality
The Conjure Woman
Conk
Connie's Inn
Consolidation Coal Company (Iowa)
Constellation (film)
Constitution of Virginia
Constitutional colorblindness
Contemporary R&B
The Cookout
Cool (American Negro aesthetic)
Cool jazz
Cooley High
Coon song
Cooper v. Aaron
Coppin State University
Copp's Hill Burying Ground
Coretta Scott King Award
Cornbread, Earl and Me
The Corner: A Year in the Life of an Inner-City Neighborhood
Cornerstone Speech
Cornrows
The Cosby Show
(List of) The Cosby Show characters
Julius Brewster Cotton
Cotton Club
Cotton Club (Portland)
Cotton Comes to Harlem
Cotton Comes to Harlem (novel)
The Council (drug syndicate)
Council of Federated Organizations
Coushatta massacre
Cover (film)
Crack epidemic
Creole Giselle
Creole music
Creoles of color
Criminal black man
Crips
The Crisis
Crooklyn
Crossover (2006 film)
Crossroads Theatre
Crunk
Cultural mulatto
Cumming v. Richmond County Board of Education
Cyrus Gates Farmstead

D

D Underbelly
Daddy's Little Girls
Dancing for eels
Dangerous Minds
Daniel Payne College (Historical)
Dap greeting
Dark Girls
Darktown Revue
Darlings of Rhythm
A Daughter of the Congo
Davis v. County School Board of Prince Edward County
Deacons for Defense and Justice
Death at an Early Age
Death at a Funeral (2010 film)
"Deep River" (song)
Deep River Boys
Def by Temptation
Def Jam's How to Be a Player
The Defiant Ones (film)
Delaware State University
Deliver Us from Eva
Delta blues
Delta Ministry
Denmark Technical College
Denmark Vesey House
Department of African American Studies – Syracuse University
DePorres Club
Desdemona (play)
Dese Bones G'wine Rise Again
Desegregation
Desegregation busing in the United States
Desegregation in the United States Marine Corps
Detroit Hair Wars
Detroit JazzStage
Diary of a Mad Black Woman (film)
Dillard University
Directive 5120.36
Dirty Gertie from Harlem U.S.A.
Dirty Laundry (2007 film)
Disappearing Acts
Disfranchisement after Reconstruction era
University of the District of Columbia
District of Columbia Compensated Emancipation Act
Dixieland
Dobyville
Dodge Revolutionary Union Movement
Don't Be a Menace to South Central While Drinking Your Juice in the Hood
Do-rag
Double consciousness
Double Dutch (jump rope)
Double-duty dollar
Double Jeopardy: To Be Black and Female
Douglass Place
Dozens (game)
Dreadlocks
Dreamgirls (film)
Dred Scott v. Sandford
Dr. Robert Walter Johnson House and Tennis Court
Drum (1976 film)
Drumline (film)
Drums and Shadows
The Duke Is Tops
The Dungeon (1922 film)
Dyer Anti-Lynching Bill
Dysfunktional Family

E

East Coast hip hop
East Oakland, Oakland, California
Ebonics (word)
Ebony (magazine)
Edge of the City
Education in Harlem
Education outcomes in the United States by race and other classifications
Edward Waters College
Elaine Race Riot
Elizabeth City State University
Emancipation Oak
Emancipation Proclamation
Emmett Till
Emmett Till Antilynching Act
Encyclopedia of the Harlem Renaissance
(List of) Enslaved people of Mount Vernon
Equal Suffrage League (Brooklyn, New York)
The Ernest Green Story
Essence magazine
Ethiopian Regiment
"Every Time I Feel the Spirit" (song)
Eve's Bayou
Executive Order 8802
Executive Order 9981
Executive Order 11063
The Exile (1931 film)
Exodus of 1879
Exodusters
Expelled Because of Color
Ex-slave repatriation
Extra Mile Education Foundation
Eyes on the Prize

F

The Fab Five (film)
Fair Employment Practices Commission
Fair Game (2005 film)
Fat Albert and the Cosby Kids
Faubourg Treme: The Untold Story of Black New Orleans
Fayetteville State University
Federal Council of Negro Affairs
Federation of Black Cowboys
Fela!
Festival Sundiata
Field holler
Fifteenth Amendment to the United States Constitution
The Fighting Temptations
Finding Me
Finding Me: Truth
The Fire Next Time
First African Baptist Church (Savannah, Georgia)
First African Baptist Church (Lexington, Kentucky)
First African Baptist Church (Richmond, Virginia)
Fisk University
The Five Heartbeats
Five on the Black Hand Side
Flight of the Red Tail
Florida A&M Hospital
Florida A&M University
Florida Black Heritage Trail
Florida Memorial University
Florida Slavery Memorial
Fodder on My Wings
Folklore
Foolish (film)
For Colored Girls
Forced into Glory: Abraham Lincoln's White Dream
For Love of Ivy
For Us the Living: The Medgar Evers Story
Fort Gadsden
Fort Howell
Fort Pillow massacre
Fort Pocahontas
Fort Robert Smalls
Fort Valley State University
Forty acres and a mule
Forty Acres and a Mule Filmworks
Fountain Hughes
Fourteenth Amendment to the United States Constitution
Four Eleven Forty Four
Freaknik
Frederick Douglass and the White Negro
Frederick Douglass National Historic Site
Free African Society
Freedman
Freedman's Savings Bank
Freedmen (ethnic group)
Freedmen's Aid Society
Freedmen's Colony of Roanoke Island
Freedmen's Bureau
(List of) freedmen's towns
Freedom Riders
Freedom suits
Freedom Summer
Freedom Writers
Free jazz
Freeman (Colonial)
Free negro
Free people of color
Freeport Doctrine
Free produce movement
Free Soil Party
Free-Stater (Kansas)
Friday (1995 film)
Friday After Next
From Black Power to Hip Hop: Racism, Nationalism, and Feminism
From Swastika to Jim Crow
Fudge Farm
Fugitive slave
Fugitive Slave Act of 1793
Fugitive Slave Act of 1850
Funeral Procession (painting)
Funk
The Future of the American Negro
The Future of the Race

G

Gadsden State Community College
Gag rule
Gamble Plantation Historic State Park
Gang of Roses
Gang system
Gangsta rap
Garveyism
Gas (2004 film)
Gebhart v. Belton
Geer Cemetery
Genius of Universal Emancipation
George Washington and slavery
Georgia Alliance of African American Attorneys
Get down
Get on the Bus
A Get2Gether
Ghetto fabulous
Ghetto tourism
Gibbs Junior College
Gillfield Baptist Church (Petersburg, Virginia)
Giles v. Harris
The Girl from Chicago
The Girl in Room 20
Glory (1989 film)
Go Down, Death!
Goffe Street Special School for Colored Children
Go for Broke (2002 film)
God's Step Children
Golden age hip hop
Golden Circle (proposed country)
Golden Slippers
Golden State Mutual Life Insurance Building
Golden Thirteen
Gold roll
Go Man Go (film)
A Good Day to Be Black and Sexy
Good Deeds
Good Fences
Good Hair
"Good Hair" and Other Dubious Distinctions
Good hair (phrase)
Good Times
Gospel music
Go Tell It on the Mountain (novel)
Graffiti in the United States
Grambling State University
Grand Contraband Camp
Greased Lightning
Great Migration (African American)
Great Plains Black History Museum
Greek Picnic
Green v. County School Board of New Kent County
The Green Pastures (film)
The Greensboro Four
Greensboro sit-ins
The Greenwood Encyclopedia of African American Folklore
Griffin v. County School Board of Prince Edward County
Griggs v. Duke Power Co.
Grind (musical)
Guadalupe College (Historical)
Guess Who (film)
Guess Who's Coming to Dinner
A Guest of Honor (opera)
Guey Heung Lee v. Johnson
Guinn v. United States
Gullah
Gullah language
The Gunsaulus Mystery

H

Hair
Hair Show
Haliwa-Saponi
Hallelujah! (film)
Hallelujah, Baby!
Hamitic League of the World
Hampton Negro Conference
Hampton University
Hard bop
Hardwood (film)
The Harimaya Bridge
Harlem Artists Guild
Harlem Globetrotters
The Harlem Globetrotters (film)
Harlem Renaissance
Harlem Riot of 1935
Harlem Riot of 1943
Harlem Riot of 1964
Harlem Writers Guild
Harriet Tubman
Harriet Tubman National Historical Park
Harris-Stowe State University
1941 Harvard–Navy lacrosse game
Hate crime
Hate group
Hav Plenty
Having Our Say: The Delany Sisters' First 100 Years
Heart of Atlanta Motel v. United States
Heat Wave (1990 film)
The Hemingses of Monticello: An American Family
Henderson v. United States (1950)
Henry Browne, Farmer
A Hero Ain't Nothin' but a Sandwich (film)
Hey, Hey, Hey, It's Fat Albert
Heyward Shepherd monument
High Freakquency
High yellow
The Highwaymen (landscape artists)
Hinds Community College at Utica
Hip hop
Hip-hop dance
Hip hop movies
Hip hop music
Hip hop production
(African-American ) Historic Places
Historically black colleges and universities
History of African Americans in Atlanta
History of African Americans in Boston
History of African Americans in Chicago
History of African Americans in Dallas-Ft. Worth
History of African Americans in Detroit
History of African Americans in Houston
History of African Americans in Kansas
History of African Americans in Los Angeles
History of African Americans in Philadelphia
History of African Americans in San Antonio
History of African Americans in Texas
History of African Americans in Utah
History of Blacks in ice hockey
History of the Jews in the African diaspora
History of slavery in Alabama
History of slavery in California
History of slavery in Connecticut
History of slavery in Georgia (U.S. state)
History of slavery in Illinois
History of slavery in Indiana
History of slavery in Kentucky
History of slavery in Louisiana
History of slavery in Maryland
History of slavery in Massachusetts
History of slavery in New Jersey
History of slavery in New York
History of slavery in North Carolina
History of slavery in Texas
History of slavery in Virginia
Hi-top fade
Hitsville U.S.A.
Hokum
Hollywood Black Film Festival
Hollywood Shuffle
Home Girls
The Homesteader
Homo hop
The Honeymooners (2005 film)
Hood films
Hoodoo (folk magic)
Hookers In Revolt
The House Behind the Cedars
House dance
House Negro
House Part (film)
House Party 2
House Party 3
House Party 4: Down to the Last Minute
Howard University
How I Spent My Summer Vacation (1997 film)
House slave
How Stella Got Her Groove Back
Huckleberry Finn
Hully Gully
Human Rights (journal)
Hunter v. Erickson
Hush harbor
Hustle & Flow
Huston–Tillotson University
Hurston-Wright Legacy Award

I

I Can Do Bad All By Myself (film)
Idlewild, Michigan
I Do... I Did!
Igbo American
Igbo people in the Atlantic slave trade
I Got the Hook Up
Imaging Blackness
The Impending Crisis of the South
I'm Through with White Girls (The Inevitable Undoing of Jay Brooks)
Incidents in the Life of a Slave Girl
Impact of the COVID-19 pandemic on African-American communities
Indian cavalry
Indian Rocks Dining Hall
In the Heat of the Night (film)
In the Heights
The Inkwell
In Living Color
Institute Catholique
Institute of Responsible Citizenship
Institutional racism
Interdenominational Theological Center
International Association of Black Actuaries
International Federation of Black Prides
Interregional slave trade
The Interruption of Everything
Introducing Dorothy Dandridge
Invisible Churches (Slavery)
Invisible Man
I Shall Not Be Moved
Isle of Canes
I Spy (1965 TV series)
Is That Black Enough for You?!?
It Ain't Nothin' But the Blues
I Will Follow (film)

J

Jack and Jill (organization)
Jackson State University
Jailhouse Blues
Jarvis Christian College
Jason's Lyric
Jayhawker
Jazz
Jazz (novel)
Jazz funeral
Jazz-funk
Jazz fusion
Jazz Profiles
Jefferson–Hemings controversy
The Jeffersons
Jelly's Last Jam
Jerkin'
J. F. Drake State Technical College
Jheri curl
J-Setting
Jet (magazine)
Jim Brown: All-American
Jim Crow (character)
Jim Crow economy
Jim Crow laws
(List of) Jim Crow law examples by State
Jivin' in Be-Bop
John Brown's last speech
John Brown's Provisional Conwtitution
John Brown's raid on Harpers Ferry
John Henry (folklore)
Johnny Bright Incident
Johnson C. Smith University
Johnson Family Vacation
The Josephine Baker Story
Journal of African American History
Journal of Black Psychology
Journal of Black Studies
Journal of Negro Education
Journal of Negro History
Journal of Pan African Studies
Judicial aspects of race in the United States
Juice (1992 film)
Juke joint
Juke Joint (1947 film)
Julia (American TV series)
Julian Scott Department Store
Jump blues
Jump In!
Jumping the Broom
Jumping the broom
Jump Jim Crow
Juneteenth
Juneteenth in Oregon
The Jungle (1967 film)
Just Above Midtown
Just Wright
Justice for Victims of Lynching Act

K

Kalunga Line
Kansas–Nebraska Act
Karamu House
Katherine Dunham Company
Katzenbach v. McClung
Kelly Ingram Park
Kentucky in Africa
Kentucky State University
Kevin Hart's Guide to Black History
A Key to Uncle Tom's Cabin
The KIDflix Film Fest of Bed-Stuy
King (TV miniseries)
"Kingdom Coming"
King's Ransom (film)
Kissing Case
Kitchen Table: Women of Color Press
Kittrell College (Historical)
Knights of the Clock
Knights of the Golden Circle
Know Your History: Jesus Is Black; So Was Cleopatra
Knoxville College
Krumping
Kufi
Ku Klux Klan
Kwanzaa

L

Lady Sings the Blues
Lady Sings the Blues (film)
Lakeview, Illinois
LaLee's Kin: The Legacy of Cotton
Lancaster County, Pennsylvania
Lane College
Langston Hughes Medal
Langston University
L.A. Rebellion
The Last Angel of History
Latin jazz
Lawn jockey
Lawrence, Kansas
Lawson State Community College
League of Revolutionary Black Workers
League of Struggle for Negro Rights
Lean on Me (film)
The Learning Tree
Leavenworth Constitution
Lecompton Constitution
Legacy (2000 film)
Leland College (Historical)
Helen Lemme
LeMoyne-Owen College
LeRoy Battle
Let's Do It Again (1975 film)
Letters to a Young Brother
Lewis College of Business
Liberia
The Liberator (anti-slavery newspaper)
Liberty Party (United States, 1840)
Life and Times of Frederick Douglass
Life as a BlackMan
"Lift Every Voice and Sing"
Abraham Lincoln's Lyceum address
Abraham Lincoln's Peoria speech
Lincoln's Lost Speech
Lincoln–Douglas debates
Lincoln Motion Picture Company
Lincoln University of Missouri
Lincoln University of Pennsylvania
Linconia
Lindy hop
Linewatch
The Links, Incorporated
Literacy tests
List of monuments to African Americans
Little Rock Nine
Livingstone College
Livin' Large
Logan family (historical)
Walter P. Lomax Jr.
Long Look Estate
1992 Los Angeles riots
Losing the Race
The Lost Man
Louisiana African American Heritage Trail
Louisiana Creole French
Louisiana Voodoo
Louisiana v. United States (1965)
Love (Toni Morrison novel)
Love Chronicles (film)
Love Don't Cost a Thing (film)
Loving v. Virginia
A Low Down Dirty Shame
Lying Lips
Lynching
Lynching of John Henry James

M

Maafa
Maafa 21
Madame Rentz's Female Minstrels
Madea's Big Happy Family (film)
Madea's Family Reunion
Magical Negro
Mahaffie House
Mahogany (film)
The Making of Robert E. Lee
Malcolm X (film)
Mama, I Want to Sing! (film)
Mammy archetype
Manumission Intelligencier
Marais des Cygnes massacre
The March (1964 film)
March on Washington Movement
Marching On!
Marci X
Marijuana
Marcus Garland
Marcus Garvey: Look for me in the Whirlwind
Margaret Garner (opera)
Marian Anderson: the Lincoln Memorial Concert
Martin Luther King, Jr. Day
Mary Ann Shadd Cary House
Maryland Constitution of 1864
Mary Don't You Weep
University of Maryland Eastern Shore
Mississippi-in-Africa
Maryland State Colonization Society
Mason County, Kentucky slave pen
Mason–Dixon Line
USS Mason (DE-529)
Massachusetts General Colored Association
Mass racial violence in the United States
M-Base
McComas Institute
McDonnell Douglas Corp. v. Green
McDonogh Three
McGill family (Monrovia)
McLaurin v. Oklahoma State Regents
M.Dia
Meat packing industry
Media Take Out
Meeting David Wilson
Meet the Browns (film)
Meharry Medical College
Melungeon
Memphis (musical)
Menace II Society
Mendez v. Westminster
A Mercy
Mestiza Double Consciousness
 Memorials to Martin Luther King
The Meteor Man (film)
Middle Passage
Midnight Ramble (film)
Miles College
Miles of Smiles, Years of Struggle
Military history of African Americans
Military history of African Americans in the American Civil War
Militia Act of 1862
Milliken v. Bradley
Million Man March
Millions More Movement
Minstrel show
Miscegenation
Misogyny in hip hop culture
Miss Ann
Miss Black America
Missing white woman syndrome
Mississippi Blues Trail
Mississippi Burning
Mississippi Damned
Mississippi Freedom Democratic Party
Mississippi Valley State University
Missouri Compromise
Missouri ex rel. Gaines v. Canada
Mister Charlie
Mitchelville
Mo' Better Blues
MoCADA
Modal jazz
Mojo (African-American culture)
Mo' Money
Monacan people
Montage of a Dream Deferred
Montgomery bus boycott
Montgomery Improvement Association
Moore v. Dempsey
Moorish Orthodox Church of America
Moorish Science Temple of America
Morehouse College
Morehouse School of Medicine
Morgan State University
Morris Brown College
Morris College
Mosaic Templars Cultural Center
Mother African Methodist Episcopal Zion Church
Motherland (2010 film)
Motown
Motown Productions
Motown Records
Moulin Rouge Hotel
Mount Auburn Cemetery (Baltimore, Maryland)
Mount Hermon Female Seminary (historical)
Mount Moor African-American Cemetery
Mount Oread
MOWA Band of Choctaw Indians
MPG: Motion Picture Genocide
Mudsill theory
Le Mulâtre
Mulatto
Mumbo Jumbo (novel)
Muncy Abolition Riot of 1842
Murder in Harlem
The Murder of Fred Hampton
Murray v. Pearson
(List of) Museums focused on African Americans
Mutiny on the Amistad: The Saga of a Slave Revolt and Its Impact on American Abolition, Law, and Diplomacy
Mutual Black Network
My Bondage and My Freedom
My Nappy Roots: A Journey Through Black Hair-itage
My Past Is My Own
Mytown (organization)

N

NAACP Image Awards
NAACP in Kentucky
NAACP Theatre Awards
Nadir of American race relations
Nansemond
Nashville Convention
Nashville sit-ins
Nassau Plantation (Texas)
Nasty C
Nasty C discography
Natchez Museum of African American History and Culture
Nation of Islam
National Abolition Hall of Fame and Museum
National Action Network
National African American Archives and Museum
National African American Leadership Summit
National Afro-American Council
National Afro-American League
The National Alliance of Black School Educators
National Anti-Slavery Standard
National Association for the Advancement of Colored People
National Association for the Advancement of Colored People v. Alabama
National Association of Black Accountants
The National Association of Blacks in Criminal Justice
National Association of Black Journalists
National Association for Black Veterans
National Association of Colored Women
National Baptist Convention, USA, Inc.
National Black Antiwar Antidraft Union
National Black Caucus of State Legislators
National Black Chamber of Commerce
National Black Child Developmental Institute
National Black Family Reunion
National Black Farmers Association
National Black Feminist Organization
National Black Law Students Association
National Black MBA Association
National Black Network
National Black Nurses Association
National Black Police Association (United States)
National Black Republican Association
National Black United Front
National Black United Fund
National Brotherhood of Workers of America
National Center of Afro-American Artists
National Civil Rights Museum
National Coalition of 100 Black Women
National Coalition of Black Lesbians and Gays
National Colored Base Ball League
National Conference of Black Lawyers
National Council of Negro Women
National Equal Rights League
National Medical Association
The National Memorial for Peace and Justice
National Museum of African American History and Culture
National Museum of African American Music
National Negro Business League
National Negro Committee
National Negro Congress
National Negro Labor Council
National Organization of Black Women in Law Enforcement
National Organization for the Professional Advancement of Black Chemists and Chemical Engineers
National Pan-Hellenic Council
National Society of Black Engineers
National Urban League
National Youth Movement
National Welfare Rights Organization
Native Son
Nat Turner's slave rebellion
Negro
Negro American League
Negro Digest
Negro Factories Corporation
Negro Fort
Negro league baseball
The Negro Motorist Green Book
Negro Mountain
Negro National League (1920–1931)
Negro National League (1933–1948)
The Negro in the South
The Negro Speaks of Rivers
The Negro Star
Negro World
Neighborhoods
Neo-soul
The Network for Better Futures
New Communities
New England Anti-Slavery Society
New England Emigrant Aid Company
New Great Migration
New Jack City
New jack swing
New Jersey Drive
The Negro Soldier
The New Jim Crow
The New Negro
New Orleans African American Museum
New South
New-York Central College
New York Conspiracy of 1741
New York Manumission Society
Next Friday
Niagara Falls Underground Railroad Heritage Center
Niagara Movement
Nigga
Nigger
Niggertown Marsh
Night Catches Us
Nixon v. Condon
Nixon v. Herndon
Nkiru Center for Education and Culture
No Crossover: The Trial of Allen Iverson
No Way Out (1950 film)
Noah's Arc: Jumping the Broom
Nora's Hair Salon
Nora's Hair Salon 2: A Cut Above
Norbit
Norfolk State University
North Carolina A&T State University
North Carolina Central University
Northern Student Movement
Norwood v. Harrison
Nothin' 2 Lose
Notorious (2009 film)
The Notorious Elinor Lee
Noyes Academy
The Nutty Professor (1996 film)
Nutty Professor II: The Klumps

O

Oakville, Alabama
Oakwood University
Oberlin–Wellington Rescue
Ocoee massacre
Of One Blood (film)
Olathe, Kansas
Old City Cemetery (Lynchburg, Virginia)
Old West Baltimore Historic District
Ol' Man River
Omaha Star
Omega Psi Phi
Once Upon a Time...When We Were Colored
One-drop rule
One More River to Cross
One People's Project
Oneida Institute
Opportunity (journal)
Orangeburg massacre
The Organization (film)
Organization of Afro-American Unity
Original 33
Origins of the American Civil War
Origins of the blues
Origins of rock and roll
Ostend Manifesto
Othermother
Oui Be Negroes
Our Nig
Out-of-Sync
The Outsider (Wright novel)

P

Pacific Movement of the Eastern World
The Pact (2008 film)
Paine College
Pan-African colors
Pan-African flag
Pan-Africanism
Pan-African Film Festival
Paper bag party
Paradise (Morrison novel)
Paradise Park, Florida
Parents Involved in Community Schools v. Seattle School District No. 1
Paris Blues
Partus sequitur ventrem
Passing (racial identity)
Passing Strange (musical)
A Patch of Blue
Patting juba
Paul Mooney: Analyzing White America
Paul Robeson: Tribute to an Artist
Paul Quinn College
PeaceOUT World Homo Hop Festival
Pearl incident
Peculiar institution
Peg Leg Joe
Pennsylvania Abolition Society
Peoples Temple
The Perfect Holiday
Perry race riot
Personal liberty laws
Person of color
Peters-Graham House
Petition of Free Negroes
Phat Beach
Phemza The Kween
Philander Smith College
Philipsburg Proclamation
Philosophia Africana
Phylon
Pick Up the Mic
A Piece of the Action (film)
Piedmont Sanatorium
Pinkster
Pioneers of African-American Cinema
Pipe Dreams (1976 film)
Piscataway v. Taxman
Plantocracy
Playhouse Theatre (Seattle)
Political hip hop
Political views of Paul Robeson
Polly (1989 film)
Pomo Afro Homos
Porgy and Bess
Porgy and Bess (film)
The Portal (community center)
Port Chicago disaster
Portrayal of black people in comics
Port Royal Experiment
Post-blackness
Post-bop
Post–Civil Rights Era African-American history
Post Traumatic Slave Syndrome: America's Legacy of Enduring Injury and Healing
Pottawatomie massacre
Pottawatomie Rifles
Pound Cake speech
Powell v. Alabama
Prairie Mission
Prairie View A&M University
Prayer kettle
Preacher's Kid (film)
The Preacher's Wife
Premium (film)
President's Committee on Civil Rights
Pressure Point (1982 film)
Pride (2007 film)
Princess Tam Tam
Progressive Black & Journalists (PB&J)
Progressive Farmers and Household Union of America
Project 21
Project Brotherhood
Proslavery
Provisional Constitution (John Brown)
Pullman Company
Punks (film)
Purlie
Purple drank

Q
Quantrill's Raiders
The Quiet One (film)
Quiet storm
Quindaro Townsite
The Quorum

R

Race & Class
Race and crime in the United States
Race and ethnicity in the NBA
Race and ethnicity in the United States Census
Race movie
Race record
Racial integration
Racial Integrity Act of 1924
Racial liberalism era
Racial segregation
Racial segregation in Atlanta
Racial segregation in the United States
Racial steering
:Category:Racially motivated violence against African Americans
Racism in the United States
Raid at Combahee Ferry
Racism in the United States
A Rage in Harlem (film)
Ragtime
Ragtime (musical)
Raid at Combahee Ferry
Rainbow Coalition (Fred Hampton)
Rainbow/PUSH
The Rainbow Sign
Raisin (musical)
A Raisin in the Sun
A Raisin in the Sun (1961 film)
A Raisin in the Sun (2008 film)
Rapping
Rawdon Street Methodist Church
Ray (film)
Rebecca's Revival
Recitatif
Red Ball Express
Redbone (ethnicity)
Red Summer of 1919
Red Tail Project
Red Tail Reborn
Regional Council of Negro Leadership
Religion of Black Americans
Rent party
Reparations for slavery
Representation of African Americans in media
Representations of African Americans in movies
Republic of Maryland
Republic of New Afrika
Research on the African-American Family
Resignation of Shirley Sherrod
Restrictive covenant
Reverse freedom rides
Reverse Underground Railroad
Revolution '67
Revolutionary integrationism
Rhythm and blues
Ride (1998 film)
Ride with the Devil (film)
The Rights of All
Right Place, Wrong Time (film)
Ring shout
River Road African American Museum
Rivers Wash Over Me
Riverside School (Elkins, West Virginia)
Rize (film)
Roanoke Island
Roger Williams College (Historical)
Roll Bounce
Roots: The Saga of an American Family
Roots (1977 miniseries)
Roots: The Next Generations
Roots: The Gift
Rosenwald Schools
Rosewood massacre
Rough Crossings
Roxbury Film Festival
Rubyfruit Jungle
Rufus Jones for President
Runaway slave
Runyon v. McCrary
Rust College

S

Sacking of Lawrence
Sagging (fashion)
Saint Paul's College
The Salon (film)
Salsa Soul Sisters
Salute (2008 film)
Sambo (racial term)
Sampling (music)
Samuel Osgood House
Sanankuya
Sanford and Son
Sarah Keys v. Carolina Coach Company
Savannah State University
Scat singing
School Daze
Scottsboro Boys
The Scottsboro Boys (musical)
S-Curl
Schomburg Center for Research in Black Culture
Second Great Migration (African American)
Second line (parades)
The Secret of Selling the Negro Market
Secret Six
Seddity
Segregated prom
Selma University
Separate Car Act
Sepia Cinderella
Set de flo'
Seventeen Again
Sexual slavery
Shaw University
Shelton State Community College
Sherman's Special Field Orders, No. 15
She's Gotta Have It
 Shields Green
Shotgun house
Show Boat
Show Boat (1929 film)
Show Boat (1936 film)
Show Boat (1951 film)
Show Boat (novel)
Showtime at the Apollo
Showtime Steppers
Shuckin' and jivin'
Shuffle Along
Shuttlesworth v. Birmingham
Siege of Charleston Union order of battle
Sierra Leone Company
(List of) singers
Signifyin'
Signifying monkey
Silent Parade
Sit-in
Sister Wife
Skirmish at Island Mound
The Ski Trip
Slater Fund
1733 slave insurrection on St. John
1842 Slave Revolt in the Cherokee Nation
Slave breeding in the United States
The Slave Community
Slave and free states
The Slave's Friend
Slave health on American plantations
Slave insurance in the United States
Slave name
Slave narrative
Slave patrol
Slave Power
Slave rebellion
Slave Trade Act of 1794
Slavery
Slavery and the Making of America
Slaveryinamerica
Slavery among Native Americans in the United States
Slavery during the American Civil War
Slavery in the colonial United States
Slavery in the United States
Slow drag (dance)
Slow jam
Smalls Paradise
Smith v. Allwright
Smith's Fly Boys
Smooth jazz
Snap music
Snow Hill Site
Snow on tha Bluff
Society for the Prevention of Calling Sleeping Car Porters "George"
Sometimes I Feel Like a Motherless Child
Songs of the Underground Railroad
Song of Solomon (novel)
Songs of My People
A Son of Satan
Sons of Haiti
Soul!
Soul food
Soul Food (film)
Soul jazz
Soul music
Soul of the Game
Soul Plane
Soul Train
Soundtrack for a Revolution
South Carolina State University
Southern Claims Commission
South Pacific (musical)
Southern University at New Orleans
Southern University at Shreveport
Southern University and A&M College
Southwestern Christian College
Space Jam
Sparkle (2012 film)
Speed-Dating
Spelman College
Spingarn Medal
The Spirit Moves
Spiritual (music)
Spoken word
The Spook Who Sat by the Door (film)
The Spook Who Sat by the Door (novel)
"Stagger Lee" (song)
The Star of Ethiopia
State of the Black Union
St. Augustine's University
Stepping (African-American)
Steppin: The Movie
Stereotypes of African Americans
Stick dance (African-American)
Still I Rise: A Cartoon History of African Americans
Stillman College
St. Mary's Beneficial Society Hall (Upper Marlboro, Maryland)
St. Mary's Honor Ctr. v. Hicks
Stomp the Yard
Stomp the Yard 2: Homecoming
Stono Rebellion
Storer College (Historical)
Storytelling
St. Philip's College (United States)
Strange Fruit
Strapped
Street Fight (film)
Stride piano
Strivers' Row
(List of black) superheroes
Student African American Brotherhood
Student Nonviolent Coordinating Committee
The Sugar Babies
Sugar Chile Robinson, Billie Holiday, Count Basie and His Sextet
Sula (novel)
Sundown town
Superspade
Supreme Team (gang)
Swann v. Charlotte-Mecklenburg Board of Education
Sweet Honey in the Rock: Raise Your Voice
Sweet sorghum
Sweet Sweetback's Baadasssss Song
Swing!
"Swing Low, Sweet Chariot"
Swing (jazz performance style)
Swing music

T

Take a Giant Step
Take This Hammer (film)
The talk (racism in the United States)
Talladega College
Tallahassee bus boycott
The Talented Tenth
Talkin' Dirty After Dark
Tantiusques
Tap dance
Tar baby
Tar Baby (novel)
Tennessee State University
Texas College
Texas Slavery Project
Texas Southern University
That's Black Entertainment
Their Eyes Were Watching God
Their Eyes Were Watching God (film)
They Call Me MISTER Tibbs!
Thicker than Water (1999 film)
A Thin Line Between Love and Hate
Thirteenth Amendment to the United States Constitution
This Christmas (film)
This Bridge Called My Back
This Is the Life (2008 film)
Three Can Play That Game
Three-Fifths Compromise
Thurgood Marshall College Fund
Timeline of African-American history
Timeline of the civil rights movement
Timeline of racial tension in Omaha, Nebraska
Time on the Cross: The Economics of American Negro Slavery
Tobacco marketing and African Americans
Tobacco and Slaves: The Development of Southern Cultures in the Chesapeake, 1680–1800
Tongues Untied
Topeka Constitution
To Sir, with Love
Tougaloo College
Traci Townsend
Tradition Is a Temple
Traditional black gospel
Transition Magazine
Trash talk
A Treatise on the Patriarchal, or Co-operative System of Society
Treatment of the enslaved in the United States
Treemonisha
Trenholm State Technical College
Tresillo (rhythm)
Triple oppression
Trippin (film)
Trois
Trois 2: Pandora's Box
Trois 3: The Escort
Tulsa race riot
Tuskegee & Its People
Tuskegee Airmen
The Tuskegee Airmen
Tuskegee Airmen National Historic Site
Tuskegee University
Tutnese
Twelfth Street YMCA Building
Twelve Years a Slave
Tyson (1995 film)

U

Uncle Jasper's Will
Uncle Remus
Uncle Tom
Uncle Tom's Cabin
Underground Railroad
United Negro College Fund
United Pentecostal Council of the Assemblies of God, Incorporated
United States National Slavery Museum
United States v. The Amistad
United States v. Cruikshank
United States Colored Troops
(List of) United States Colored Troops Civil War units
(List of) U.S. communities with African-American majority populations
(List of) U.S. counties with African American majority populations
(List of) U.S. metropolitan areas with large African-American populations
United States v. Johnson (1968)
United States v. Montgomery County Board of Education
Unity Day (Philadelphia)
Unity Fellowship Church Movement
Universal Negro Improvement Association and African Communities League
Up from Slavery
Uptown Saturday Night
Uptown Theater (Philadelphia)
Urban Bush Women
Urban contemporary music
Urban contemporary gospel
Urban fiction
The urbanization of blacks in America
US Organization
USS Kitty Hawk riot
USS PC-1264

V
Vanguard Justice Society
Veiled Aristocrats
(List of black) video game characters
The Virgin of the Seminole
University of the Virgin Islands
Virginia State University
Virginia Union University
Virginia University of Lynchburg
The Voice of the Negro
Voorhees College
Voter Education Project
Voting Rights Act
Voting rights in the United States
Vogue (dance)

W

Wages of Sin (1929 film)
Waist Deep
Waiting to Exhale
Walkaround
The Wanderer (slave ship)
A Warm December
Fenwick Henri Watkins
Watson v. Fort Worth Bank & Trust
Watts Riots
"The Weary Blues"
Welcome Home Roscoe Jenkins
We-Sorts
West Indian American
West Coast hip hop
West Oakland, Oakland, California
West Virginia State University
Western University (Kansas) (Historical)
Weyanoke, Virginia
What's Love Got to Do with It (film)
When Men Betray (1929 film)
The White Negro
Whiteface (performance)
White guilt
Who's the Man?
Who's Your Caddy?
Why Did I Get Married Too?
Why Did I Get Married?
Why Do Fools Fall in Love (film)
Why I Hate Abercrombie and Fitch
Why We Bang
Wigger
Wilberforce University
Wiley College
Wilfandel
William Lynch speech
Williams v. Mississippi
William and Mary Hosmer House
William E. Harmon Foundation award for distinguished achievement among Negroes
Winks Panorama
Winston-Salem State University
With or Without You (2003 film)
The Wiz
The Wiz (film)
Wolf ticket
A Woman Called Moses
Womanist theology
Women of Color Policy Network
Women's Political Council
Woo (film)
The Wood
Working With the Hands
Work song
Wyandotte Constitution

X
Xavier University of Louisiana

Y
 Henry Clay Yerger
Youngblood (1978 film)
Young Boys Inc.
Young, Gifted and Black
"You've Got to Be Carefully Taught"

Z
Zephaniah Kingsley
Zoodio
Zora Neale Hurston House
Zora Neale Hurston Museum of Fine Arts
Zouzou (film)

References 

 
African-American-related topics